The 2021 Hawaii Rainbow Warriors volleyball team represented the University of Hawaiʻi at Mānoa (UH) in the 2021 NCAA Division I & II men's volleyball season. The Rainbow Warriors, led by 12th-year head coach Charlie Wade, played home games at Stan Sheriff Center on the UH campus in the Honolulu neighborhood of Mānoa. The Rainbow Warriors, members of the Big West Conference, were picked by Big West coaches to win the conference in its preseason poll. After a late start was announced, Hawaii went undefeated in conference play. The Rainbow Warriors suffered their first and only setback in the semifinals of the Big West Tournament, forcing them to receive an at-large bid to the NCAA Tournament. Despite the setback, Hawai'i received the #1 seed in the national tournament and went on to win the National Championship with straight set wins over UC Santa Barbara in the semifinals and BYU in the national championship. The national championship is Hawai'i's first men's volleyball national championship after they had to vacate the 2002 national championship.

Season highlights
Will be filled in as the season progresses.

Roster

Schedule
TV/Internet Streaming information:
All home games were televised on Spectrum Sports. All road games were also streamed on ESPN3 or Big West TV. The NCAA Tournament was streamed on B1G+ (opening round, quarterfinals), NCAA.com (semifinals), and the Championship was televised nationally on ESPNU.

 *-Indicates conference match.
 Times listed are Hawaii Time Zone.

Announcers for televised games
UC Irvine: Rob Espero & Charlie Brande
UC Irvine: Rob Espero & Charlie Brande
UC San Diego: Miles Himmel & Ricci Luyties
UC San Diego: Miles Himmel & Ricci Luyties
UC Santa Barbara: No commentary
UC Santa Barbara: No commentary
UC Santa Barbara: No commentary
UC San Diego: Kanoa Leahey & Lisa Strand
UC San Diego: Kanoa Leahey & Lisa Strand
Long Beach State: Kanoa Leahey & Lisa Strand
Long Beach State: Kanoa Leahey & Lisa Strand
CSUN: Darren Preston
CSUN: Darren Preston
UC Irvine: Kanoa Leahey & Lisa Strand
UC Irvine: Kanoa Leahey & Lisa Strand
UC San Diego: Kanoa Leahey & Lisa Strand
UC Santa Barbara: Paul Sunderland & Kevin Barnett
BYU: Paul Sunderland & Kevin Barnett

Rankings 

^The Media did not release a Pre-season, Week 13, or Week 14 poll.

References

2021 in sports in Hawaii
Hawaii Rainbow Warriors volleyball
2021 NCAA Division I & II men's volleyball season
2021 Big West Conference men's volleyball season